The Alberni Pacific Railway is a heritage railway originating in Port Alberni, British Columbia. Due to budget and equipment concerns, the railway did not operate in the 2020 season.

Rolling stock
The railway is powered by locomotive No. 7 -  a 1929 Baldwin 2-8-2ST steam locomotive departing from the 1912 CPR Station. It uses rebuilt Canadian National Railway transfer cabooses as passenger cars. The 40-minute excursions go to the McLean Mill National Historic Site.

Along with the steam locomotives, there is an Alco RS3 diesel electric locomotive. There are five running coaches, three open and two covered.

Locomotive roster
 No. 2 is a Lima  2-truck Shay steam locomotive. It is on display on special occasions. It no longer holds pressure due to boiler problems.

 No. 7 is a Baldwin  2-8-2 ST.  This engine is currently out of service for rebuilding.

 No. 112 is a Baldwin  2-6-2 ST. It is currently in the initial stages of rebuilding.

 No. 11 diesel is a World War II Locomotive built in 1942 later used as a MacMillan Bloedel switching locomotive and weighs . This locomotive is used as the back-up motive power for trains on the APR if the #7 breaks down.

 No. 8427 is an ALCO RS-3. It weighs  and has a  output. It is out of service requiring work on its wheels. 8427 was built in 1954 for the Canadian Pacific Railway. It was purchases by Crown Zellerbach Ltd. around 1970's  and used in their logging operation in Ladysmith. The Western Vancouver Island Industrial Historical Society acquired it around 1994/95. This unit is believed to be the last surviving unit of a CP RS-3.

See also

E&N Division of the CRHA
Alberni Valley Heritage Network
List of heritage railways in Canada

References

External links
Official Website of the Alberni Pacific Railway
E&N Division — Canadian Railroad Historical Association

Heritage railways in British Columbia
Port Alberni
Alberni Valley
Railway companies established in 1912